George Elder Burley (born 3 June 1956) is a Scottish former football player and manager. He had a professional career spanning 21 years as a player, making 628 league appearances and earning 11 Scotland caps. His most successful spell came while at Ipswich Town making 394 senior appearances, and being part of the squad that won the FA Cup and UEFA Cup in 1978 and 1981 respectively.

Burley's managerial career began in 1990 with Ayr United and has since spent spells at seven different clubs, including an eight-year spell back at Ipswich Town as manager, which included a promotion to the Premier League and guiding the club to a fifth place league finish at that level. On 24 January 2008 he was appointed manager of the Scotland national team. He was sacked on 16 November 2009, following a 3–0 defeat to Wales.

His nephew, Craig, is also a former Scotland international footballer.

Playing career

Burley was born in Cumnock, East Ayrshire. He joined Ipswich Town in 1972 as an apprentice and made his senior debut against Manchester United at Old Trafford in 1973, being given the job of marking George Best. In 1978, he was a member of the Ipswich side which upset the odds to defeat Arsenal 1–0 in the FA Cup final. However, in 1981 injury forced him out of Ipswich's UEFA Cup final triumph over AZ Alkmaar. Town missed out on the First Division title on the last day of the season, finishing runners-up to Aston Villa.

In 1985, he joined Sunderland after making 500 appearances for Ipswich, and was part of the Sunderland team that slipped into the Third Division in 1987, only to win promotion a year later.

He played for Gillingham in the 1988–89 season, but was unable to prevent them from being relegated to the Fourth Division. He moved back to Scotland in 1989 to play for Motherwell.

Burley received eleven Scotland caps.

Management career

Ayr United
Burley joined Ayr United as a player-manager in 1991, succeeding Ally MacLeod. In his first season, he took United to the B&Q Centenary Cup Final and again reached the final of the competition (by then renamed the B&Q Challenge Cup) the following season. However, he did not succeed in taking Ayr back to the Premier League and was dismissed in 1993 for adverse results with the side's place in the First Division in serious jeopardy.

Motherwell
Burley moved briefly to Falkirk in 1993 as a player before returning to Motherwell as player-coach.

Colchester United
In June 1994 Burley returned to East Anglia as player-manager of Colchester United. He played seven first team games and managed the club for 20 matches, 8 of which they won, before returning to Ipswich Town in December.

Ipswich Town
Burley was appointed manager at his former club, with Dale Roberts as his assistant, having had talks with Town without Colchester knowing and so compensation was duly paid. He made his playing return for Ipswich, ten years after his last game for the club in a match against Motherwell in 1995 although didn't feature again as a player.

During an eight-year reign he took Ipswich to three play-offs semi finals before finally winning promotion to the Premier League on the fourth attempt via the play-offs at Wembley beating Barnsley 4–2.

The following season, he guided the club to fifth place and qualification for the UEFA Cup. This earned him the 2000–01 Premier League Manager of the Season award. Relegation the following season saw Burley's side struggling at the foot of Football League First Division and his contract was terminated by mutual agreement in 2002.

Burley again applied for the job in 2012, losing out to Mick McCarthy. He was later critical of how the club was being run, in 2017, following the club's lowest finishing in nearly 60 years, stating that:The tradition of this club, with what Alf Ramsey, Bobby Robson and even myself achieved shouldn't be forgotten. Right now, Ipswich should be contesting for the top six in the Championship every year at the very least – that's where I think they should be. I was at the club for 21 years as a player and manager and the standard never dropped below that. That's the level Ipswich Town should be endeavouring to be at again. That's where they should expect to be. It's that type of club.When I took over in 1994 the first thing I said was I wanted to take the club back into Europe and we did that.

Burley again showed interest in the Ipswich job following Mick McCarthy's exit in 2018, but he again lost out in favour of Paul Hurst.

In November 2002, Burley was on the verge of taking over as Stoke City manager, but he had a late change of heart and declined the offer.

Derby County
In 2003, Burley became interim manager of Derby County while permanent manager John Gregory was suspended. Burley managed to halt Derby's alarming slide towards the relegation zone of the First Division (just one season after relegation from the Premier League) and kept the club up comfortably. Burley was then appointed manager permanently when Gregory was sacked. The following season (2003–04) was often a struggle, with Derby actually finishing two places lower than the season before, but there were signs of improvement. This showed through in the 2004–05 season when, despite spending no money on new players, Burley transformed Derby from relegation contenders to a fourth-place finish and play-off semi-finalists. However, things were not as happy as they seemed on the surface with Burley's relationship with director of football Murdo Mackay and the club's board (who sold star player Tom Huddlestone without informing Burley) being very strained. After days of speculation and mudslinging, Burley announced his resignation from Derby in June 2005.

Heart of Midlothian
Burley was appointed manager of Heart of Midlothian on 30 June 2005. A stunning start to his tenure as Hearts manager saw them top the Scottish Premier League after the first ten games, winning eight of these, including a 4–0 victory over rivals Hibernian – proving themselves to be genuine title challengers. However, he left the club the day after major shareholder Vladimir Romanov, with whom Burley had a notoriously uneasy relationship, announced a bid to take private control of Hearts. A club statement declared his departure was by mutual consent because of irreconcilable differences.

Southampton
Burley was appointed as Head Coach of Southampton on 23 December 2005 following the departure of Harry Redknapp. The club's technical director, Sir Clive Woodward, was moved sideways to a newly created post as director of football as part of restructuring following Burley's appointment, before eventually leaving the club in August 2006. Following the change in control of the club in July 2006, Burley's title was changed to that of "manager". He guided Southampton to the 2006–07 play-offs but lost on penalties in the second-leg of the semi-final after drawing 4–4 on aggregate against his former club Derby County, who went on to win the final.

Scotland
It was announced on 24 January 2008 that Burley had taken over the position of Scotland manager. Burley signed a contract with the Scottish board until 2012. He became the third former Ipswich manager to manage his country, as Alf Ramsey and Bobby Robson had before him. In his first match in charge, Scotland drew 1–1 with Croatia. In the following two friendlies, Scotland failed to register a victory, with a 3–1 loss against the Czech Republic, and a goalless draw with Northern Ireland.

Although winning 2–1 against Iceland in their second game of the 2010 World Cup qualifying campaign, Burley received heavy criticism for the 1–0 defeat to Macedonia in the opening match and a 0–0 home draw against Norway. Questions were raised about his choice of bringing on uncapped Chris Iwelumo (who missed an open goal from 3 yards) instead of proven-goal scorer Kris Boyd. The Rangers striker quickly announced his retirement from international football while Burley was still in charge.

Scotland were defeated 3–0 in Amsterdam by the Netherlands, but then recovered by beating Iceland 2–1 at home. The team lost 4–0 to Norway in their next match, putting Burley's bid to take Scotland to the World Cup for the first time since 1998 in jeopardy. Qualification to the play-offs remained in Scotland's hands, with the team needing to win the two remaining fixtures to be guaranteed second place. Scottish FA chief Gordon Smith moved to confirm that Burley's position was not under threat, but said that much depended on the final two matches.

In the end, a 2–0 home victory over Macedonia at Hampden on 5 September 2009 was followed four days later by a 0–1 defeat at home to the Netherlands, ending Scottish hopes of qualifying for the finals.

Despite failure to qualify for the 2010 World Cup, Burley was given the backing of the SFA at a meeting on 15 September 2009, to lead the country into the Euro 2012 qualifying campaign.

His final game as Scotland manager was a 0–3 loss to Wales on 14 November 2009 in Cardiff. On 15 November 2009, Burley came under fire, with reports suggesting he would lose his job as Scotland manager. and the following day, Burley was sacked as manager of Scotland after winning just three out of fourteen games.

Crystal Palace
On 17 June 2010, Burley took charge of Crystal Palace, with fellow Scot Dougie Freedman as his assistant. His first league match as Crystal Palace manager ended in a 3–2 victory over Leicester City. He was sacked after a 3–0 defeat against Millwall on New Year's Day, 2011.

Apollon Limassol
On 10 May 2012, Burley was appointed as manager of Cypriot side Apollon Limassol. He was sacked after two games in charge due to an alleged rift with the club's sporting director.

Managerial statistics

Honours

Player
Ipswich Town
Texaco Cup: 1972–73
FA Cup: 1977–78
UEFA Cup: 1980–81

Sunderland
Football League Third Division: 1987–88

Individual
Ipswich Town Player of the Year: 1976–77

Manager
Ayr United
Scottish Challenge Cup runner-up: 1990–91

Ipswich Town
Football League First Division play-offs: 2000

Individual
Premier League Manager of the Month: November 2000
Premier League Manager of the Year: 2000–01
LMA Premier League Manager of the Year: 2000–01
LMA Manager of the Year: 2000–01
Ipswich Town Hall of Fame: Inducted 2009
Scottish Premier League Manager of the Month: August 2005, September 2005

References

External links

Profile Goal.com 
Scotland profile londonhearts.com
Scotland management profile londonhearts.com

1956 births
Living people
Scottish footballers
Scottish Football League players
English Football League players
Scotland under-21 international footballers
Scotland international footballers
1982 FIFA World Cup players
Ipswich Town F.C. players
Sunderland A.F.C. players
Gillingham F.C. players
Colchester United F.C. players
Motherwell F.C. players
Falkirk F.C. players
Ayr United F.C. players
UEFA Cup winning players
Scottish football managers
Scottish expatriate football managers
Scotland national football team managers
Scottish Premier League managers
Ayr United F.C. managers
Colchester United F.C. managers
Ipswich Town F.C. managers
Derby County F.C. managers
Heart of Midlothian F.C. managers
Southampton F.C. managers
Crystal Palace F.C. managers
Premier League managers
People from Cumnock
Association football fullbacks
English Football League managers
Scottish Football League managers
Apollon Limassol FC managers
Scotland under-23 international footballers
Scotland youth international footballers
Footballers from East Ayrshire
FA Cup Final players